The Al Seef Towers is a cluster of three residential buildings in the Jumeirah Lake Towers in Dubai, United Arab Emirates. The complex has two towers that are 35 floors and one tower 40 floors. Construction of the Al Seef Towers was completed in 2008.

Towers
The complex consists of 3 buildings:

Fire 2012
At 1:30 am on 18 November 2012 a fire broke out at Tamweel Tower, which forced the temporary evacuation of the building. The fire was later proven to have been started by a cigarette butt, discarded by a careless smoker. The building was made uninhabitable by the fire, and is expected to be reconstructed at a cost of Dh78 million. However, as of November 2014, work had yet to begin.

See also 
 List of tallest buildings in Dubai

References

External links
Emporis
Tamweel Tower Fire (video, 27 secs)

Residential skyscrapers in Dubai
Residential buildings completed in 2007